The county of Shropshire in England is divided into two unitary authorities: Telford and Wrekin and Shropshire Council. As there are 361 Grade II* listed buildings in the county they have been split into separate lists for unitary authority.

Grade II* listed buildings in Shropshire Council (A–G)
Grade II* listed buildings in Shropshire Council (H–Z)
Grade II* listed buildings in Telford and Wrekin

See also
Grade I listed buildings in Shropshire

References
National Heritage List for England